Boca Chica is a town and corregimiento in San Lorenzo District, Chiriquí Province, Panama. Its population as of 1990 was 171; its population as of 2000 was 291.

There is only one road (paved in 2008) to this town and it ends at the estuary of the Pedregal River with the island of Boca Brava just across the water.  Boca Chica is the main jumping off point for the islands in the Gulf of Chiriquí. The village is known for its sport fishing (black marlin, dorado and tuna are abundant) and many businesses in the area are geared toward that activity.

Boca Chica is the home to the  Annual International Jigging and Popping Tournament (the first held on June 11, 2009) where the winner took in a 130 lb. yellowfin tuna for a $10,000 prize

Its popularity as a prime fishing destination has attracted a number of developers to the Boca Chica area.  As a result, a growing expat population has been established in recent years. 

It is also a popular anchorage for sailboat and Powerboat Cruisers.  Its proximity to David and Pedregal make it a well protected provisioning anchorage with basic services.  Served by a regional airport in Pedregal, and by several Bus lines.

References

Corregimientos of Chiriquí Province